Villains United is a six-issue 2005 comic book limited series, published by DC Comics, written by Gail Simone and illustrated by Dale Eaglesham and Wade Von Grawbadger, and later by Val Semeiks and Prentis Rollins.

Publication history
Villains United is one of four miniseries leading up to DC Comics' Infinite Crisis event and a seven-issue miniseries. This story follows the evolution of the latest incarnation of the Secret Six, and the group's ongoing plight against the machinations of the various supervillains belonging to Lex Luthor's expansive Secret Society of Super Villains.

Like all major intracompany events, this series ties in with several monthly DC Comics titles, including:
Action Comics #830-831
Batman: Gotham Knights #66
Breach #7
Firestorm #17
Nightwing #109-110
Superman #221
Catwoman #46-49
Green Arrow #50
Flash #225

Plot summary
For months now, former President Lex Luthor has been using his resources to assemble an army against the superheroes. Luthor's team now has over two hundred members with a six-member core team consisting of Luthor, Talia al Ghul, Doctor Psycho, Deathstroke, Black Adam, and the Calculator.  Nevertheless, not all the villains offered a chance to join this army are thrilled with this idea. Batman villain Catman has joined a team of five supported by the mysterious Mockingbird including Cheshire, Deadshot, Scandal, Ragdoll, and Parademon to oppose this new Secret Society. Catman replaced the first Fiddler, after he was killed by Deadshot on Mockingbird's orders when Mockingbird felt he had not fulfilled his part in a mission.

The Mockingbird
Late one night in the mansion of the Secret Six, Catman and Deadshot have a discussion about their unknown leader, Mockingbird, and about the dramatic change in Catman's life, while Cheshire secretly listens in the shadows. Afterwards, Scandal informs everyone that Mockingbird has just assigned them to steal Thanagarian weaponry from a tanker in Gotham harbor.

Upon their arrival at the tanker, the Six are ambushed and captured by members of the Society, including Weather Wizard, Cheetah, Doctor Polaris, Count Vertigo, Killer Frost, Captain Nazi, Hyena, Crazy Quilt, and others. The Crime Doctor tortures the Six, asking them, among other questions, the identity of Mockingbird. After a few rounds of torture, Catman breaks free and rescues his teammates. While escaping, the Six decide to send the Society a message. They murder one of the two Hyenas.

The Six then infiltrate a Society installation in Brazil. After fighting their way through a legion of H.I.V.E. troopers, apparently led by the Queen Bee, they discover the Society's plans for the "Vindication Scenario": erasing the memories of all of Earth's superheroes. The facility is a giant battery, powered by kidnapped heroes Firestorm and Gehenna. The Six release Firestorm just as Black Adam arrives with a response team, and the facility is destroyed.

Betrayal
Once the Six return to their base, Cheshire and Catman are in bed together when Cheshire accuses Catman of being a spy and wanting to be a hero.  However, she reveals that she has slept with him in order to conceive a child.

A short time later, most of the Society's founding council votes to mount a final strike on the Secret Six — Lex Luthor disagrees with a preemptive attack, but the remaining four members (Black Adam is absent for unknown reasons) decide the action is necessary.  Simultaneously, the Six agree to a last stand, but only under the condition that any survivors be set free from Mockingbird's control with no strings attached.

The Six hunted
Prior to the battle between the Society and the Six, Deadshot visits Scandal's room to talk about the team's future. A framed picture on the woman's desk reveals that her father is the immortal Vandal Savage. Before the conversation can progress past basic greetings, Catman ambushes Deadshot and admits knowing that he (Deadshot) masqueraded as the villainous Deathstroke and murdered the lions in his pride. The two scuffle before finding the real Deathstroke leading a small band of villains to the front door of the House of Secrets.

As the crew debates how the Society found them, Cheshire confesses to several traitorous deeds, including giving Luthor the coordinates of the Six's base and covertly joining the Society. When asked why she would do such a thing, considering Mockingbird's threat to kill her daughter if she does not comply, Cheshire points out that the baby she is having with Catman would make a fine replacement for a lost child.

Mockingbird revealed
The Society storms through the castle, and Cheshire is shot by Deathstroke, who comments that "The Society doesn't need traitors". The Secret Six, however, fights back successfully. Talia and Scandal, daughters of immortals Ra's al Ghul and Vandal Savage, respectively, fight each other. Just when Talia has the upper hand, Scandal's mole in the Society, Knockout, knocks her out (it is also revealed that Knockout is Scandal's lover).  Ragdoll convinces Solomon Grundy, a fellow "ugly monster", to switch sides.  Ragdoll fights his father until Parademon beats the elder Rag Doll. Catman and Ragdoll Jr. escape from Black Adam's group while Parademon blows up himself, Rag Doll and the battleground. Deathstroke and Deadshot duel, ultimately shooting each other at the same time. To save his daughter Scandal, Vandal Savage infiltrates the Society's headquarters and threatens to kill Luthor if he does not disengage the attack against the Six. Reluctantly, and over Black Adam's objections, Luthor ends the battle. Deadshot is led to medical help by the surviving members of the Secret Six.

The central revelation of the book is that Mockingbird is actually Lex Luthor and that the Luthor who organized the Secret Society is an "imposter" (in reality, Alexander Luthor, Jr.). Mockingbird/Luthor reveals that he chose those six individuals because each had different knowledge and experience that could be used to oppose the Society: Catman, for his knowledge of Batman's villains; Deadshot, for his knowledge of the remaining Suicide Squad members; Parademon, for his experience living on Apokolips; Ragdoll, because he grew up as a "nephew" to the members of the Injustice Society; Scandal, because she grew up with Vandal Savage and his associates; and Cheshire, for her knowledge of the Teen Titans villains.  Mockingbird/Luthor reveals to Scandal that he never placed the families of the Six in danger and disbands the team. Also notable is the Society Luthor's apparent murder of Pariah, a character from the original Crisis.

Villains United: Infinite Crisis Special #1 - "A Hero Dies but One"

In Villains United: Infinite Crisis Special #1, the Secret Six meet to discuss their future as a team, with Deadshot recommending they be a mercenary team for good or evil, "as long as we get paid".

In phase one of a master plan, the Society executes "Operation: Hope Abandoned", engineering breakouts at metahuman holding facilities worldwide. Oracle masses responses as fast as possible, but with the "Big Guns" of the Justice League unavailable, the heroes are having problems just holding the line. Contacting the Martian Manhunter, Oracle organizes a global telepathic link.

Meanwhile, the Secret Six intercept the Scarecrow and Amos Fortune fleeing Enclave M, and discover that all supervillains, once freed, are to head to Metropolis. They relay this information to Green Arrow, who informs J'onn. Lady Blackhawk commandeers aircraft to traffic all available heroes and National Guardsmen to Metropolis.

An army of second-stringers, vigilantes and retired metas (including Argus, Geist, Manhunter and El Diablo) align with the authorities to fend off the Society's assault.  Leading the villains' charge is Doctor Psycho, flanked by the monster he and "Monsieur" Warp unleashed from imprisonment: Doomsday.

High above the battle, Catman informs the rest of the Six they are to remain neutral, even after the battle. The Six leave, determined to be an independent group, while the battle continues.

Society's roster
See List of Secret Society of Super Villains members

Collected editions
The series has been collected into a trade paperback:
 Villains United (collects Villains United #1-6, 144 pages, January 2006)
 Secret Six Vol. 1: Villains United (collects the Villains United six-issue miniseries, Villains United: Infinite Crisis Special #1 and the Secret Six six-issue miniseries; 328 pages, DC Comics, February 2014)

The one-shot special was also collected in Infinite Crisis Companion.

Notes

External links
Guide to Infinite Crisis:  Villains United - study of series as part of Infinite Crisis

2005 comics debuts
2005 comics endings
Infinite Crisis
Comics by Gail Simone